Pterospermum menglunense is a species of flowering plant in the family Malvaceae. It is found only in China.

References

menglunense
Endemic flora of China
Critically endangered plants
Taxonomy articles created by Polbot